World's Ultimate Strongman is an annual strength athletics competition which began on October 26, 2018. The event has a number of rival and parallel competitions, including the World's Strongest Man, the Arnold Strongman Classic and the Giants Live Tour.

History
The inaugural edition of the competition was held in Dubai, United Arab Emirates with the winner being Hafþór Júlíus Björnsson. The 2019 edition was also held in Dubai and was won by Mateusz Kieliszkowski. Defending champion Hafþór Júlíus Björnsson and recently crowned World's Strongest Man Martins Licis did not take part.

On February 22, 2020, it was announced the competition would be expanding and would hold an event in Bahrain at the Bahrain International Circuit with a purse of $350,000 which is the largest for any strongman competition.

Effects of the 2019–20 coronavirus pandemic
On March 13, 2020, World's Ultimate Strongman released a statement entailing that the recently announced event due to take place on April 11, 2020, in Bahrain was postponed due to concerns over the COVID-19 pandemic, to which they said that a new date would be found and announced when it is logistically and feasibly possible. The 2020 competition was finally held in March 2021 under the name '2021 WUS Strength Island' and in September they hosted the 2021 competition.

Championships

2018 World's Ultimate Strongman
Events: Truck pull, Arm over arm pull, Silver Dollar Deadlift, Overhead Medley, Super Yoke, Atlas stones

2019 World's Ultimate Strongman
Events: Deadlift, Truck pull, Log lift, Medley, Atlas stones

2020 World's Ultimate Strongman (a.k.a. 2021 WUS Strength Island)
Events: Axel Deadlift, Flag Hoist, Circus Dumbbell press, Loading race, Atlas stones

2021 World's Ultimate Strongman
Events: Log lift, Super yoke, Farmer's walk, Chain Railway carriage, Atlas stones

Championship breakdown

Championships by country

Feats of Strength series
Due to the postponement of worldwide sporting events and travel restrictions being in place for many countries due to the COVID-19 pandemic, World's Ultimate Strongman announced an at home/private gym Feats of Strength series with differing strongman record attempts to be live streamed for free. Below are the record attempts (Men's World Record unless otherwise stated):

Season 1 

1 It was found during the event that Maddox's bar had been misloaded with one side being 25kg heavier than the other. 
2 It was found during the event that Bishop had 402.5kg on the barbell, rather than 400kg, causing an unofficial world record of 402.5kg for 4 repetitions.

Season 2

Commonly contested events
 Deadlift – Lifting weights or vehicles straight off the ground until knees lock in a standing position. Straps are allowed for this variation. The 2019 edition used the conventional strongman version of the deadlift, using a standard deadlift bar with straps and a deadlift suit.
 Super Yoke – Apparatus composed of a crossbar and two uprights. The uprights each have a heavy weight attached to them, such as a refrigerator or diesel engine, and the competitors must carry the yoke on their shoulders for a short distance.
The Shield Carry can be its own event or be used alongside the super yoke.
 Press Medley – Athletes must press various equipment overhead such as a log, axle, circus barbell, and giant dumbbell. The event is scored based on the number of implements completed, then the fastest time.
 Vehicle pull – Vehicles such as transport trucks, trams, boxcars, buses, or planes are pulled across a  course as fast as possible. One variation sees the competitors pull the object with a rope toward them. Another has them attached to a rope which is attached to a vehicle, while they use another rope to pull themselves down the course.
When the stones were first introduced to the competition, it was an individual event and the platforms were all of equal height.

References

Strongmen competitions